Little Red Wagon is a 2012 docudrama directed by David Anspaugh and written by Patrick Sheane Duncan.

Little Red Wagon may also refer to:
 "Little Red Wagon" (song), 2015
 Dodge Little Red Wagon, a drag racing truck introduced in 1965
 Little Red Wagon Foundation, a charity for children in need
 Little Red Wagon, a 1999 album by Bart Ramsey and Neti Vaan
 My Little Red Wagon, a book by Alma Powell
 Little Red Wagon Playschool, a playschool in Newton, Massachusetts

See also
 Radio Flyer